Bryan may refer to:

Places

United States
 Bryan, Arkansas
 Bryan, Kentucky
 Bryan, Ohio
 Bryan, Texas
 Bryan, Wyoming, a ghost town in Sweetwater County in the U.S. state of Wyoming
 Bryan Township (disambiguation)

Facilities and structures
 Bryan House (disambiguation)
 Bryan Boulevard, Greensboro, North Carolina, USA; a limited access highway
 Bryan Museum, Galveston, Texas, USA; a museum
 Bryan Tower, Dallas, Texas, USA; an office tower skyscraper

People
Bryan (given name), list of people with this name
Bryan (surname), list of people with this name
 Justice Bryan (disambiguation), judges named Bryan
 Baron Bryan, a baronial title of Plantagenet England

Other uses 
 Bryan University, Tempe, Arizona, USA; a for-profit private university

See also 

 "Bryan, Bryan, Bryan, Bryan", a 1919 poem by Vachel Lindsay
 Bryan Inc. (2015 TV series) construction and renovation TV series starring Bryan Baeumler
 Bryan, Brown & Company, a footwear company
 Bryan Foods, a subsidiary of Sara Lee
 Bryan Cave, a law firm
 O'Bryan (born 1961), American singer-songwriter
 Bryant (disambiguation)
 Brian (disambiguation)
 Brianna (disambiguation)
 Brianna (given name)
 Bryanne